The  Cheaha Wilderness lies next to Cheaha State Park, near the Talladega Mountains in Alabama, United States. It lies within the Talladega National Forest and is administrated by the US Forest Service.  Congress designated the area on January 3, 1983 and expanded it in 1988.

Primarily following a ridge system through Talladega National Forest, the Pinhoti crosses the top of Cheaha Mountain.

References

External links 
 Wilderness.net
 TopoQuest Map

Protected areas of Clay County, Alabama
IUCN Category Ib
Wilderness areas of Alabama
Alabama placenames of Native American origin